Family Plan is a 2005 American television comedy film directed by David S. Cass Sr., written by Rick Gitelson, and starring Tori Spelling and Greg Germann. It filmed in Los Angeles by Mat IV Productions in association with Alpine Media and Larry Levinson Productions and was presented by Hallmark Entertainment. It premiered on February 12, 2005 on the Hallmark Channel, as part of their Valentine's Day celebration. This is the feature film debut of Chloë Grace Moretz.

Plot
Charlie works for a company that is taken over by Walcott, who believes family values are a priority.  Career-driven Charlie does a little fibbing when under the pressure of Walcott's standards, and believes she's in the clear. But when Walcott invites himself over for dinner, she borrows her friend's house and daughter and hires actor Buck to play her husband for the evening. The one-night "act" turns into a full-time gig when her boss decides to rent the house next door for the summer, forcing Charlie and Buck to stay together in the fake lifestyle she created.

Cast
 Tori Spelling as Charlie
 Chloë Grace Moretz as Young Charlie
Greg Germann as Walcott
 Jordan Bridges as Buck
 Kali Rocha as Stacy
 Kate Vernon as Victoria
 Jon Polito as Gold
 Christopher Cass as Troy
 Abigail Breslin as Nicole

Reception
Hal Erickson from All Movie Guide wrote: "Family Plan will probably seem a breath of fresh air to anyone who hasn't seen such movies as Picture Perfect and Good Neighbor Sam, or who can't remember the mid-1960s TV sitcom Occasional Wife."  The movie premiered with a 1.4 household rating and was viewed by more than 1.9 million unduplicated viewers. It was also part of Hallmark Channel's third-highest day to date, and was ranked among the top 10 in the time period for household rating (#10).

References

External links
 
 
 Family Plan on HallmarkChannel.tv

2005 television films
2005 films
2005 comedy films
Hallmark Channel original films
American comedy television films
Films directed by David S. Cass Sr.
Films scored by David Kitay
Films shot in Los Angeles
2000s English-language films
2000s American films